Vess is both a surname and a given name. Notable people with the name include:

Charles Vess (born 1951), American illustrator and comics artist
Vess Ossman (1868–1923), American banjoist and recording artist
Vess Quinlan (born 1940), American poet